is a Japanese multimedia project created by Key and Visual Arts in October 2020, which also includes toy figurines by Kotobukiya, a short story serialization and a web novel. A 12-episode anime television series by Bibury Animation Studios aired from July to September 2022. A four-volume kinetic novel series written by Tōya Okano is in development by Key.

Characters

Kuronekotei

A doll whose setting was once resetted before coming to Kuronekotei. Because of this, she is ignorant of the ways of world and sometimes clumsy. However, she always tries her best to do something for the people around her. She is 138cm and her favorite food is Anpan. Her dream is to learn about her own function.

The leader doll at Kuronekotei. She is sometimes strict, but is very caring of people around her. Her body parts are made from junk parts that Nagi found in order to repair her. Despite her parts being old and worn, she refuses to exchange her parts for new ones as she believes her body is a gift that Nagi gave to her. She is 155cm and her favorite food is rich peanut butter shake. Her dream is to protect Kuronekotei.

A doll whose favorite food is taiyaki. She speaks in a blunt tone. Her dream is to embark on a new mission.

Others 

A girl who sometimes helps out at Kuronekotei.

Nagi's ex co-worker.

Media

Print
A web novel titled , written by Tōya Okano and illustrated by Maroyaka, has been periodically released on the project's official website since October 26, 2020. Encore features spoken lines of dialogue and as a result is referred to as a "lite kinetic novel" in reference to Key's line of visual novels described as kinetic novels because their gameplay offers no choices or alternate endings.

A series of short stories titled , written by Kai and illustrated by Maroyaka, began serialization in ASCII Media Works's Dengeki G's Magazine with the December 2020 issue sold on October 30. The serialization continued on a monthly basis until the November 2021 issue sold on September 30 when it was announced that it would halt temporarily.

Two manga adaptations were announced: , illustrated by Yuriko Asami, began serialization on the ComicWalker and Nico Nico Seiga websites on July 15, 2022. , illustrated by Daiko Toda, began serialization on the Comic Bushiroad Web platform on August 12, 2022.

Anime
An anime television series, directed by Tensho and animated by Bibury Animation Studios, aired from July 9 to September 24, 2022, on Tokyo MX, MBS, BS Asahi, and AT-X. The screenplay is written by Kai and Tōya Okano. Character design is provided by Akane Yano who based the designs on original illustrations by Na-Ga, Fuzichoco, Yui Hara, En Morikura and Lack. The opening theme song is "Tin Toy Melody" composed by Jun Maeda, and performed by Chat Noir (consisting of Azumi Waki, Tomori Kusunoki, Miyu Tomita, Yuki Nakashima and Akari Kitō). The series is licensed worldwide excluding Asian territories by Sentai Filmworks.

Episode list

Visual novels
A series of four visual novels, described as kinetic novels since their gameplay offers no choices or alternate endings, are in development by Key. The main scenario is written by Tōya Okano, who co-wrote the scenario for the anime adaptation. The first three volumes are set to release in 2023, and volume four is scheduled for release in 2024.

Other
In collaboration with plastic model and figurine manufacturer Kotobukiya, a series of 1/7 scale figurines of the characters was announced to be in production in October 2020. A figurine of Haizakura was released on August 30, 2021, and the limited edition release came bundled with the single . "Kikaijikake no Sanka" is sung by Azumi Waki, Tomori Kusunoki, Miyu Tomita, Yuki Nakashima and Akari Kitō; "Usuhanazakura" is sung by Waki. A figurine of Karasuba was announced in May 2021.

Notes

References

External links
 
Anime official website 

2020 Japanese novels
Bibury Animation Studios
Bishōjo games
Dengeki G's Magazine
Fictional gynoids
Key (company)
Key (company) games
Mass media franchises
Science fiction video games
Sentai Filmworks
Tokyo MX original programming
Video games developed in Japan
Visual novels
Windows-only games
Windows games